Qeshlaq-e Khurasha-ye Sofla (also Romanized as Qeshlāq-e Khūrāshā-ye Soflá; also known as Qeshlāq-e Khūrāshā) is a village in Dizmar-e Markazi Rural District, Kharvana District, Varzaqan County, East Azerbaijan Province, Iran. At the 2006 census, its population was 28, in 6 families.

References 

Towns and villages in Varzaqan County